Reber may refer to:

 Reber, German last name

Places

Slovenia
 Reber, Žužemberk
 Reber pri Škofljici